Shana Falana is an American shoegazing band from Brooklyn, New York, currently based in Kingston, New York. They are currently signed to Team Love Records. The band consists of musicians Shana Falana and Michael Amari.

History
Shana Falana began in February 2011 with the release of two collections of songs on their bandcamp titled Channel and Velvet Pop. In January 2012, the band released an EP titled In The Light.

On April 7, 2015, Shana Falana released their debut full-length album, Set Your Lightning Fire Free, via Team Love Records followed by a 38-date United States tour.

The track "There's A Way" is featured on the 2016 compilation The Future's So Bright It Berns!, which was made to support the presidential campaign of Bernie Sanders.

On October 21, 2016, the band released its second album, "Here Comes the Wave".

Discography
Studio albums
Set Your Lightning Fire Free (2015, Team Love)
Here Comes the Wave (2016, Team Love)
Darkest Light (2019)

EPs and collections
Channel (2011)
Velvet Pop (2011)
In The Light (2012)

References

Musical groups established in 2011
Musical groups from Brooklyn
American shoegaze musical groups
2011 establishments in New York City